Kristina Michaud  (born February 1, 1993) is a Canadian politician who was elected as a Bloc Québécois member of the House of Commons of Canada in 2019. She represents the riding of Avignon—La Mitis—Matane—Matapédia.

Electoral results

References

External links

Members of the House of Commons of Canada from Quebec
Bloc Québécois MPs
Living people
21st-century Canadian politicians
21st-century Canadian women politicians
Women members of the House of Commons of Canada
Year of birth uncertain
People from Amqui
1993 births